The Bumerang-BM or DUBM-30 Epoch is a remotely controlled turret for the T-15 Armata heavy IFV, Kurganets-25 and Bumerang platforms. It was first seen in public in 2015 during rehearsals for the Moscow Victory Day Parade, mounted on those three platforms.

Design
The turret is designed by the KBP Instrument Design Bureau.

Armament

The turret has a pair of Kornet-EM anti-tank guided missiles (ATGMs) on either side, enabling it to salvo fire two missiles at once, either at separate targets or to "double tap" the same one to overwhelm active protection systems.

Operators

See also
 Bumerang
 Kurganets-25
 T-15 Armata

References

External links

Remote weapon stations
KBP Instrument Design Bureau products
Military equipment introduced in the 2010s